This article contains a list of fossil-bearing stratigraphic units in the state of Maine, U.S.

Sites

See also

 Paleontology in Maine

References

 

Maine
Stratigraphic units
Stratigraphy of Maine
Maine geography-related lists
United States geology-related lists